, more commonly known simply as Hiroko (styled in capitals) and nicknamed  or Cat's Eye, is a retired Japanese female mixed martial arts (MMA) fighter. She fought for Invicta FC, Strikeforce and Jewels, and was the final Smackgirl Open Weight Champion.

Early life
Through a personal friend's suggestion, Yamanaka initially took on mixed martial arts for health and fitness purposes only. After time, she found the sport of MMA agreed with her physicality and became more involved, fighting her first official match in May 2006.

Mixed martial arts career

This was her professional debut.

On  at Smackgirl: Queens' Hottest Summer, Yamanaka defeated champion Yoko Takahashi by unanimous decision and won the Smackgirl Open Weight Championship, becoming the fourth and final title holder. This was Yamanaka's last fight in Smackgirl since the promotion folded in the following months.

On , Yamanaka defeated Josh Barnett's student Shannon Hooper by unanimous decision during the event Jewels 3rd Ring.

On , Yamanaka defeated Atsuko Emoto by unanimous decision at Jewels 8th Ring. Emoto announced her retirement after the fight.

Yamanaka was originally set to face Olympic freestyle wrestling Bronze medal winner Randi Miller, but Miller was forced to withdraw due to injury.

On , Yamanaka was announced as facing Miller at Jewels 11th Ring on December 17. However, the fight was later cancelled. Yamanaka faced Molly Helsel instead and defeated Helsel by TKO in the second round.

She defeated Esui by armbar submission in the second round.

On September 23, 2011, Strikeforce announced that Yamanaka would debut for the promotion against featherweight champion Cris Cyborg. Yamanaka lost the bout via TKO 16 seconds into the first round. On January 6, 2012, the bout's result was changed to a no decision due to Cyborg having tested positive for anabolic steroids.

She was defeated by unanimous decision.

She was defeated by unanimous decision.

On August 6, 2013, Yamanaka announced her retirement on her official blog, thanking her fans for their support and saying she would like to continue to support her team, Master Japan, in the future.

Submission grappling
Yamanaka made her debut in submission wrestling in the 2006 Smackgirl Grappling Queen Tournament, being defeated by American fighter Roxanne Modafferi by decision.

Shoot boxing career
She faced Mayumi "Super Benkei" Aoki, whom Yamanaka had previously defeated in MMA, and won the fight by TKO in round one.

On , Yamanaka faced Megumi Yabushita in a shoot boxing match at the 2011 Shoot Boxing Girls S-Cup. She won the fight by TKO (doctor stoppage) after Yabushita suffered a knee injury in round three.

Mixed martial arts record

|-
| Loss
| align=center| 12-3 (1)
| Ediane Gomes
| Decision (unanimous)
| Invicta FC 4: Esparza vs. Hyatt
| 
| align=center| 3
| align=center| 5:00
| Kansas City, Kansas, United States
| 
|-
| Loss
| align=center| 12-2 (1)
| Germaine de Randamie
| Decision (unanimous)
| Strikeforce: Rousey vs. Kaufman
| 
| align=center| 3
| align=center| 5:00
| San Diego, California, United States
| 
|-
| NC
| align=center| 12-1 (1)
| Cris Cyborg
| No Contest (overturned by CSAC)
| Strikeforce: Melendez vs. Masvidal
| 
| align=center| 1
| align=center| 0:16
| San Diego, California, United States
| 
|-
| Win
| align=center| 12-1
| Esui
| Submission (armbar)
| Jewels 15th Ring
| 
| align=center| 2
| align=center| 2:20
| Tokyo, Japan
| 
|-
| Win
| align=center| 11-1
| Molly Helsel
| TKO (punches)
| Jewels 11th Ring
| 
| align=center| 2
| align=center| 3:12
| Tokyo, Japan
| 
|-
| Win
| align=center| 10-1
| Sandy Furner
| Submission (forearm choke)
| Shoot Boxing: Girls S-Cup 2010
| 
| align=center| 1
| align=center| 1:45
| Tokyo, Japan
| 
|-
| Win
| align=center| 9-1
| Atsuko Emoto
| Decision (unanimous)
| Jewels 8th Ring
| 
| align=center| 2
| align=center| 5:00
| Tokyo, Japan
| 
|-
| Win
| align=center| 8-1
| Hitomi Akano
| Decision (split)
| Jewels 7th Ring
| 
| align=center| 2
| align=center| 5:00
| Tokyo, Japan
| 
|-
| Win
| align=center| 7-1
| Shannon Hooper
| Decision (unanimous)
| Jewels 3rd Ring
| 
| align=center| 2
| align=center| 5:00
| Tokyo, Japan
| 
|-
| Win
| align=center| 6-1
| Michiko Takeda
| TKO (punches)
| Jewels 2nd Ring
| 
| align=center| 2
| align=center| 3:25
| Tokyo, Japan
| 
|-
| Win
| align=center| 5-1
| Mayumi Aoki
| Decision (unanimous)
| Jewels 1st Ring
| 
| align=center| 2
| align=center| 5:00
| Tokyo, Japan
| 
|-
| Loss
| align=center| 4-1
| Hitomi Akano
| Submission (armbar)
| Smackgirl: World ReMix 2008 Second Round
| 
| align=center| 2
| align=center| 3:10
| Tokyo, Japan
| 
|-
| Win
| align=center| 4-0
| Yoko Takahashi
| Decision (unanimous)
| Smackgirl: Queens' Hottest Summer
| 
| align=center| 3
| align=center| 5:00
| Tokyo, Japan
| 
|-
| Win
| align=center| 3-0
| Michiko Takeda
| Decision (split)
| Smackgirl: The Queen Said The USA Is Strongest
| 
| align=center| 2
| align=center| 5:00
| Tokyo, Japan
| 
|-
| Win
| align=center| 2-0
| Yuiga
| Decision (unanimous)
| Smackgirl: Will The Queen Paint The Shinjuku Skies Red?
| 
| align=center| 2
| align=center| 5:00
| Tokyo, Japan
| 
|-
| Win
| align=center| 1-0
| Rie Murakami
| Decision (unanimous)
| Smackgirl: Legend of Extreme Women
| 
| align=center| 2
| align=center| 5:00
| Tokyo, Japan
|

Submission grappling

Legend:

Shoot boxing record

Legend:

Championships and accomplishments
 Smackgirl Open Weight Champion
 Super Gals Mix Cup Open Weight Tournament winner

See also
List of female mixed martial artists

References

External links
 Hiroko Yamanaka Awakening Profile

Profile at Fightergirls.com
Jewels profile 
Official blog 
Official blog (old) (Internet Archive) 
 Official Strikeforce Fighter Profile

1978 births
Living people
People from Kisarazu
Japanese female mixed martial artists
Featherweight mixed martial artists
Mixed martial artists utilizing Muay Thai
Mixed martial artists utilizing shootboxing
Japanese female kickboxers
Japanese Muay Thai practitioners
Female Muay Thai practitioners
Sportspeople from Chiba Prefecture